Crescentini is a surname. Notable people with the surname include:

Carolina Crescentini (born 1980), Italian actress
Dino Crescentini (1947–2008), Sammarinese bobsledder
Federico Crescentini (1982–2006), Sammarinese footballer
Francesco Florimo (1800–1888), Italian librarian, musicologist, historian of music and composer
Giorgio Crescentini (born 1950), Sammarinese footballer
Girolamo Crescentini (1762–1846), Italian singer castrato, singing teacher and composer